is a female Japanese race walker. Konishi represented Japan at the 2008 Summer Olympics in Beijing, where she competed for the women's 20 km race walk, along with her compatriot Mayumi Kawasaki. She finished the race in twenty-sixth place with a time of 1:32:21, two seconds behind Greece's Evaggelia Xinou.

References

External links

NBC 2008 Olympics profile

1982 births
Living people
Japanese female racewalkers
Olympic athletes of Japan
Athletes (track and field) at the 2008 Summer Olympics
Sportspeople from Osaka
20th-century Japanese women
21st-century Japanese women